This article contains episode information and plot summaries from the television show Balamory for series 4. Series 4 was broadcast from April 2005.

Cast
Main cast are listed on the main Balamory page.

Episodes

References

2005 Scottish television seasons
Balamory